Hilton Forrest Deakin (13 November 1932 – 28 September 2022) was an Australian Roman Catholic prelate.

Born in Seymour, Victoria, Deakin was ordained to the priesthood for the Roman Catholic Archdiocese of Melbourne in 1958. He served as titular bishop of Murthlacum and as an auxiliary bishop for the Archdiocese of Melbourne from 1993 until his death in 2022.

References

1932 births
2022 deaths
Australian Roman Catholic bishops
Bishops appointed by Pope John Paul II
Clergy from Melbourne
Appointees to the Order of Australia
Recipients of the Order of Timor-Leste